Janni Arnth Jensen (born 15 October 1986) is a Danish former footballer who played as a defender. She previously played for Danish Elitedivisionen club Fortuna Hjørring, Swedish Damallsvenskan club Linköpings FC, English club Arsenal, in Italy for Fiorentina, and for Rangers in the Scottish Women's Premier League. She was the vice-captain for the Danish national team.

Club career
She played for Fortuna Hjørring after joining in January 2007, following spells at Outrup BK and Varde IF.

In August 2014, Arnth Jensen signed for Linköpings FC and made her debut for the club in the 2014 Svenska Cupen final, where Linköpings came from behind to defeat Kristianstads DFF 2–1. She won the 2016 Damallsvenskan title with Linköpings and signed a new two-year contract with the club in November 2016. Following Magdalena Eriksson's departure mid-season in 2017, Arnth was named the new captain of Linköpings FC.

In November 2018 Arnth signed to play with English WSL club Arsenal, with the transfer effective in January 2019.

After a spell with Italian club Fiorentina, Arnth signed for Scottish club Rangers in September 2021. On 27 September 2022, she announced her retirement from football.

International career
At the girls' football tournament at the 2003 European Youth Olympic Festival, Arnth Jensen played in the final as Denmark beat Switzerland on penalties after a 1–1 draw at Stade Sébastien Charléty in Paris.

Arnth Jensen made her senior international debut in January 2010, in a 2–1 win over Chile. She was named in national coach Kenneth Heiner-Møller's Denmark squad for UEFA Women's Euro 2013.

Honours

Club
Fortuna Hjørring
Winner
 Elitedivisionen: 2009–10

Runner-up
 Elitedivisionen: 2011–12, 2012–13
 Danish Women's Cup: 2012–13

Linköpings FC

Winner
 Damallsvenskan: 2016, 2017
 Swedish Women's Cup: 2013–14

Rangers
Winner
 Scottish Women's Premier League: 2021-22,

References

External links

 
 Danish football stats  at DBU 
 
 
Profile at fussballtransfers.de
Profile at soccerdonna.de

1986 births
Living people
Danish women's footballers
Denmark women's international footballers
Fortuna Hjørring players
Danish expatriate men's footballers
Danish expatriate sportspeople in Sweden
Expatriate women's footballers in Sweden
Linköpings FC players
Damallsvenskan players
Women's association football defenders
Arsenal W.F.C. players
Expatriate women's footballers in England
Danish expatriate sportspeople in England
Women's Super League players
Fiorentina Women's F.C. players
Danish expatriate sportspeople in Scotland
Expatriate women's footballers in Scotland
Danish expatriate sportspeople in Italy
Expatriate women's footballers in Italy
Rangers W.F.C. players
UEFA Women's Euro 2017 players